Loretta Oduware Ogboro-Okor is a Nigerian UK trained consultant obstetrician gynaecologist.  She is a medical simulator expert and global goodwill ambassador. She is president of University of Benin Alumni Association, UK

Early life and education 
Loretta was born in Benin City Edo state to Prince Richard  Osarogiuwa Ogboro and Rose Ogboro née Uwadia on August 28, 1977.

She completed her primary education at Lydia primary school and gained admission on national merit to the Federal government girls college Benin city where she became Head girl and passed the  WAEC examination with all As.

She studied medicine at the University of Benin college of medical science and graduated in 2003 with MBBS.

Loretta contributed to discussions by Edo state government on controlling the spread of Covid-19 in the state

She holds a masters in Public health research from the University of Edinburgh and another in clinical education from Sheffield Hallam University. She has a Ph.D. in law and criminology in view from Sheffield Hallam University.

Career 

Loretta Ogboro-Okor is a consultant obstetrician and gynaecologist in the UK. She also writes and contributes to various publications including the Journal of medical and Basic Scientific Research where she is a member of the editorial board.

A member of the Royal college of obstetricians and gynaecologists in the UK, she is currently a consultant obstetrician and gynaecologist with the Rotherham NHS Foundation Trust.as well as an obstetrics skills and drills lead with the Doncaster and Bassettlaw teaching hospital  foundation Trust.

Loretta Ogboro-Okor contributes to discussions that concern improvement of health care delivery in Nigeria and overseas.

As an author she has published an autobiography My Father's Daughter  and Heartwebs.

Personal life 

She is married to Dr Douglas Okor a neurosurgeon.

Loretta is into advocacy through her blog Loretta Reveals where she writes on issues like politics, gender inclusion and social reform. 

She is lead for the  health care policy group in the Obi-Datti presidential campaign and was a panelist at the Big Tent Coalition telethon televised on Nigerian television to raise funds for the labor party presidential candidate, Peter Obi.

In 2021, she was appointed into the Diaspora agency committee by Gov.Godwin Obaseki of Edo state.

She is the co-founder of the Ashanti Graham health and education foundation which builds capacity of health care professionals and gives prizes to graduating students in the medical field who excel.

Loretta Ogboro-Okor was part of the Midwestern professionals led by Don Pedro Obaseki who were calling for restructuring in Nigeria as a group

Awards 
Loretta won the Accenture 10th Gender mainstreaming awards as positive role model West Africa award in the management, consulting and legal services sector

References 

1977 births
Living people
Nigerian obstetricians